The 1976 Corby District Council election took place on 6 May 1976 to elect members of Corby District Council in Northamptonshire, England. This was on the same day as other local elections. It was the first election be held under new ward boundaries. The Conservative Party gained overall control of the council from the Labour Party, for the first and only time in its history.

Ward-by-Ward Results

Central Ward (3 seats)

Danesholme Ward (3 seats)

East Ward (2 seats)

Hazelwood Ward (3 seats)

Kingswood Ward (3 seats)

Lloyds Ward (3 seats)

Lodge Park Ward (3 seats)

Rural East Ward (1 seat)

Rural North Ward (1 seat)

Rural West Ward (1 seat)

Shire Lodge Ward (2 seats)

West Ward (2 seats)

References

1976 English local elections
1976
1970s in Northamptonshire